Macedonia is a city in northern Summit County, Ohio, United States. The population was 12,168 at the 2020 census. It is a suburb of the Akron metropolitan area.

History

The city's name is said to derive from a small joke among divinity students at Western Reserve College, which in the early 19th century was in Hudson, Ohio. The students, who were called upon to preach in the small hamlet  to the north, recalled Acts 16:10: "...we sought to go to Macedonia, concluding that the Lord had called us to preach the gospel to them."

Geography
Macedonia is located at  (41.317807, -81.501460).

Demographics

The median income for a household in the city was $77,866, and the median income for a family was $88,906. The per capita income for the city was $32,960. About 2.1% of the population were below the poverty line. Of the city's population over the age of 25, 41.2% holds a bachelor's degree or higher.

2010 census
As of the census of 2010, there were 11,188 people, 4,338 households, and 3,231 families residing in the city. The racial makeup of the city was 83.6% White, 10.4% African American, 0.1% Native American, 3.9% Asian, 0.4% from other races, and 1.6% from two or more races. Hispanic or Latino of any race were 1.3% of the population.

There were 4,338 households, of which 31.1% had children under the age of 18 living with them, 63.5% were married couples living together, 8.0% had a female householder with no husband present, 3.0% had a male householder with no wife present, and 25.5% were non-families. 21.3% of all households were made up of individuals, and 9.6% were composed of a person 65 years or older living alone. The average household size was 2.58 and the average family size was 3.01.

The median age in the city was 43.4 years. 22.3% of residents were under the age of 18; 6.5% were between the ages of 18 and 24; 24% were from 25 to 44; 32.7% were from 45 to 64; and 14.7% were 65 years of age or older. The gender makeup of the city was 48.5% male and 51.5% female.

Notable people

 Je'Rod Cherry, retired, NFL safety, New England Patriots
 Mark Foster, musician and lead vocalist for the indie pop band Foster the People
 John Lefelhocz, conceptual artist and quilter
 Ronald M. Sega, retired NASA Astronaut
 Rob Sims, NFL guard, Detroit Lions, former The Ohio State University Buckeye, former Nordonia Knight
 Jason Trusnik, NFL Player former Cleveland Browns and Miami Dolphins
 Denzel Ward, drafted in 1st Round of 2018 NFL Draft, NFL cornerback, Cleveland Browns, former The Ohio State University Buckeye, former Nordonia Knight
 Vonda Ward, female boxer and former University of Tennessee basketball player

References

External links
 City of Macedonia website

Cities in Ohio
Cities in Summit County, Ohio
Cleveland metropolitan area